Brookula olearia is a species of sea snail, a marine gastropod mollusk unassigned in the superfamily Seguenzioidea.

Description
The maximum recorded size of the shell is 1 mm.

Distribution
This species occurs in the Atlantic Ocean off Brazil, found at depths between 1050 m and 1350 m.

References

 Bouchet, P.; Fontaine, B. (2009). List of new marine species described between 2002-2006. Census of Marine Life.

olearia
Gastropods described in 2005